1994–95 Ukrainian Third League was the last season of the experimental Third League. For the following year the league was consolidated into the Druha Liha. All the teams that placed above 17th place were welcome to apply for participation in the Druha Liha along with any successful amateur teams.

The season started on August 14, 1994, with the final round being played on July 2, 1995. The newly reformed CSKA won the top awards. However, those medals were snatched from under the nose of the leading Nyva Myronivka who were in the lead with only two rounds to go. Those, together with the Tysmenytsia men, were the main challengers for the gold by the end of the season. This was the last year that the relegated clubs left the league and if Shakhtar Stakhanov was showing some determination for a victory, Zalishchyky were pretty much forced out of the league by various circumstances, such as poor performance.

Team change

Relegated team
Two teams were relegated from the 1993–94 Ukrainian Second League.
 FC Dnister Zalishchyky – 21st place (debut)
 FC Shakhtar Stakhanov – 22nd (last) place (debut)

Promoted teams
Six group winners and six runners-up of 1993–94 Ukrainian Football Amateur League
 FC LAZ Lviv – winner of the Group 1 (debut)
 FC Lada Chernivtsi – runner-up of the Group 1 (debut)
 FC Advis Khmelnytskyi – winner of the Group 2 (debut)
 FC Keramik Baranivka – runner-up of the Group 2 (debut)
 FC Transimpeks Vyshneve – winner of the Group 3 (debut)
 FC Sula Lubny – runner-up of the Group 3 (debut)
 FC Avanhard Rovenky – winner of the Group 4 (debut)
 FC Vahonobudivnyk Kremenchuk – runner-up of the Group 4 (debut)
 FC Metalurh Novomoskovsk – winner of the Group 5 (debut)
 FC Shakhtar Horlivka – runner-up of the Group 5 (returning after 1 season, last competed in the 1992-93 season)
 FC Tavria Novotroitske – winner of the Group 6 (debut)
 FC Dnistrovets Bilhorod-Dnistrovskyi – runner-up of the Group 6 (debut)

Final standings

Notes
 Dnister, Fetrovyk, Lada, and Sula withdrew from the league.
 Hart changed its name to Systema-Borex
 CSK ZSU changed its name to CSKA
 Avanhard-Industiya was known simply as Avanhard
 Skify-LAZ was known as LAZ

Top scorers
Mykola Kovalchuk (CSKA) - 24
Viktor Pobehayev (Systema) - 24 (3)
Vadym Vus (CSKA) - 17
Oleksandr Dovhalets (Advis) - 15 (3)
Ihor Shylo (Avanhard-Ind) - 15 (8)

Transimpeks-Slavutych situation
The recently promoted Transimpeks was based in Vyshneve, then the club moved to Trezine where it changed its name to Transimpeks-Ros-2 (as a second team for FC Ros Bila Tserkva). Both clubs went through some financial difficulties and Transimpeks ended up with the greater impact. The administration of Ros could not afford another team and replaced it with amateurs from Kyiv Oblast. Skhid Slavutych this season was competing in the amateur competitions, at first being situated in Yahotyn and later relocating all the way to Slavutych. By the end of the season Skhid Slavutych  was promoted to the Third League to replace the "purged" Transimpeks, forfeiting all its games in the amateur competitions. Skhid, however, managed not to get relegated and was allowed to be promoted to the Second League becoming a professional club. In four of its games Skhid earned four points by winning one home game in Slavutych and earning a draw in Bilhorod.

See also
 Ukrainian Second League 1994-95
 Ukrainian First League 1994–95
 Amateur championship 1994-1995
 1994–95 Ukrainian Cup

External links
 Table and results

Ukrainian Third League seasons
4
Ukra